was a Japanese reporter who specialized in covering show-business gossip and scandals. He was born in Nakano, Tokyo.

Career
After graduating from Hosei University in 1968, Nashimoto first worked as a magazine reporter for the publisher Kodansha. He became a reporter for a TV Asahi show in 1976, covering celebrity gossip and scandals. His catchphrase was "kyoshuku desu" (sorry to bother you) when questioning show business celebrities. He served as a guest professor at Hakodate University from 2000 to 2004.

Lawsuits
In 2002, Nashimoto, together with the Tokyo Sports newspaper, was successfully sued by actor Mayo Kawasaki over insinuations that he had been involved in an extra-marital relationship.

Illness and death
Nashimoto announced in June 2010 that he had been diagnosed with lung cancer. He died in a Tokyo hospital on 21 August 2010, aged 65.

Works

References

External links
 Official blog 
 

1944 births
2010 deaths
Japanese television personalities
People from Nakano, Tokyo